D-274 (or D) is the model name of a concert grand piano, the flagship of the Steinway & Sons piano company, first built in 1884. It is generally described as the first choice of most concert pianists. As of 2017 a D-274 finished in Polished Ebony has a MSRP of US$175,700.

In concert hall settings, on the other hand, the D-274 is a major presence. An example would be the famous Van Cliburn International Piano Competition, offers contestants a choice of two D-274s owned by the Van Cliburn Foundation, one a mellow-toned instrument made in New York, the other a bright-toned instrument made in Hamburg. These are supplemented with a third Steinway piano brought in for the event.

An estimate from 2003 suggested that more than 90 percent of concert grand pianos worldwide are D-274s.

Design 

Virtually all critical design elements of the Steinway 'D' were developed during the 19th century. Among them are the action and string scale designs perfected by Henry Steinway Jr., the company founder's son; the hammers, cast iron frame and laminated wooden rim, all originating in designs patented by C.F. Theodor Steinway, another of the founder's sons; the trapwork (pedals), first devised by Albert Steinway, a third son; and most aspects of the soundboard. Since those early years, only two notable improvements have been made: a concentric shaping of the soundboard, a design patented by younger family member Paul Bilhuber, was introduced in 1936; more recently the Steinway action was changed to provide a greater mechanical advantage to the player, resulting in less touch resistance with no loss of power.

History 

Even before the German-born family emigrated to the United States, the founder, Henry E. Steinway, had built a grand piano in 1836 (the so-called "kitchen grand"), which today is preserved at the Steinway Hall in New York City. Such grand pianos with a limited keyset of 6 or 6.5 octaves and double strings produce less volume of sound than a D-type concert grand piano.

Concert grand pianos of full size are able to fill a concert hall with sound for 2,000 to 3,000 spectators. This was foreshadowed in the 1860s when grand pianos were given harps or frames of cast iron. Initially employed to accommodate the cumulative and extraordinary tension of the strings, thereby protecting the wooden structure from destruction, iron frames quickly facilitated a dramatic increase in string tension. With increased string tension came increased power and projection.

At the 1876 Centennial Exposition in Philadelphia, Pennsylvania, there were several manufacturer's competitions, including a piano competition. The Steinway company sent two grand pianos displaying their latest developments, demonstrating the firm's innovative and markedly improved piano quality. Their determined pursuit of quality was rewarded at the world exhibition with a gold medal. Steinway won the competition against several established, well-known American piano makers, including Chickering and Sons and Weber.

This Steinway concert grand piano, the direct predecessor of today's Model 'D', has become known as the "Centennial grand". It remained in production until 1878, when improvements prompted the Steinways to re-designate their models, replacing numeric designations (Types 1 through 4) with Model letters, i.e., A, B, C and D. These letters still mark the types of Steinway's four largest instruments.

This was a time of remarkable advance:

The open pinblock was discarded in favor of the full frame.
Always mindful of production as well as excellence, Steinway realized that covering the pinblock with the plate would save manufacturing costs. Open blocks had necessitated multiple levels (to account for the height difference between the bass and treble bridges), whereas this disparity could be easily compensated for in the full frame casting. Further, the pinblock was no longer visible and as such needed no cosmetic treatment such as an attractive veneer.

The capo d'astro bar displaced agraffes in the upper treble sections.
While agraffes continue to be used in the bass, tenor and lower treble of modern instruments, earlier pianos also employed them in the upper treble. The massively cast capo bar, an integral part of the plate, enhanced the clarity and power of the upper treble

The pedal lyre was strengthened dramatically, and the pedals redesigned as a self-contained unit.
Pedaling became more reliable and precise, and withstood violent pedaling that often accompanies violent playing.

String lengths and tensions increased dramatically, and hammers were made heavier and employed denser felt.
These and other improvements remarkably enhanced the performance, power and brilliance of the new Steinway 'D', enabling it to fill ever-expanding concert venues with sufficient sound.

Development of the modern D-274 

In 1878, Steinway began producing their new small Models 'A' and 'B' with laminated maple cabinets, creating the modern "rim" case: Very long, thin (3.5 mm) planks of maple were slathered with hide glue, bent around a form, clamped together and allowed to dry. This process made rim fabrication quicker, and the resultant structure stronger and more stable. It also was cheaper, requiring fewer man-hours and being less wasteful of hardwoods that need several years of storage and precise seasoning. This speedier production method was of great advantage in a time of huge demand for good pianos.

In 1880, the two big grand models 'C' and 'D' were changed accordingly. The old 'Henry'-designed (father & son) C grand (formerly named 'Parlor Grand') also got a covered pinblock and a 'rim' (still with 85 keys), and the concert grand Model 'D' which had made a great success on the Centennial Exhibition 1876 in Philadelphia also got a 'rim' case. There are nearly no two identical grands of the 424 Centennial D-270 once built. One will find at nearly every grand tiny modifications. So one can regard the concert grand Centennial D-270 (1875–1884) as a transient model for continuous improvement. Of the known still existing Centennial grands, there is ca. a 2/3 portion with 'constructed case' and a 1/3 portion with 'rim'.

After the concert success of an 1883 prototype 'D' that featured a laminated case, radically higher string tension and capo bar (which began at note 36 yet retained vestigial agraffes all the way to note 88), Steinway unveiled the 1884 'D', a fully realized new model with a redesigned scale (including a 20-note instead of a 17-note bass), a capo bar in both upper treble sections, a newly designed pedal lyre, and a multi-laminated case.

In subsequent years few changes occurred, though the instrument's length increased slightly (the "rim type" D concert grand pianos from 1884 to about 1895 were only 272 cm long). However, in 1936 a soundboard based on a patent of Paul Bilhuber, an "in-law" member of the Steinway family, was introduced. Bilhuber had created a soundboard that tapered evenly from the thickest central point to a thinner perimeter, and it was judged to provide greater response and longevity.

Not all Steinway innovations were successful. In 1961, Teflon bushings for the playing mechanism were incorporated into U.S.-built grand pianos – a modification that the piano makers at the Hamburg branch did not adopt despite much pressure from the New York-based company. They were able to resist only because the profits of the Hamburg plant were greater than those of the New York factory.

The Teflon bushings were intended to lessen friction problems that might occur because of seasonal humidity changes, but they themselves caused excessive friction. Further, because they were a hard and dimensionally stable substance (fixed into wood, which is not), at certain times of the year they would loosen in their holes and cause clicking during play. After years of complaints from pianists and technicians, in 1982 the New York makers re-introduced the classic felt bushings with an infused dry-grease fluid made with Teflon particles that allowed them to keep using the word Teflon in their advertising.

The Steinway Model 'D' represents about 5 percent of all Steinway grand pianos produced, a significantly larger share of concert-grand output than the 1-2 percent that other manufacturers produce. An explanation is found not only in their exceptional quality but in their sophisticated marketing programs – the Steinway Artists program and the concert grand piano banks in New York City, London, and Hamburg have virtually guaranteed the loyalty of concert artists worldwide. On U.S. stages, more than 90 percent of performances using a concert grand use a Steinway 'D'.

Of the approximately 600,000 pianos Steinway has built (as of 2010), about 25,000 are Models 'D'. Only 424 of the predecessor "Centennial D" pianos were built; about 30 are still known to exist.

Artists' preference – geographic origin and specific instruments 

Steinway manufactures the 'D' in two factories, one in New York and one in Hamburg, Germany. Outwardly, New York and Hamburg 'D's differ most noticeably in finish, with the former displaying traditional satin lacquer and the latter high-gloss polyester. Differences in the respective instruments' tone and playing character, however, have led particular pianists to gravitate to the output of one factory or the other; Vladimir Horowitz, for instance, preferred a New York 'D', whereas Marc-Andre Hamelin, Alfred Brendel, Mitsuko Uchida, Burkard Schliessmann, Grigory Sokolov, Arcadi Volodos, Artur Rubinstein and Krystian Zimerman were partial to the Hamburg product.  Garrick Ohlsson preferred the brilliance of the Hamburg instrument in his youth, but the warmth of the New York 'D' as he matured. Sergei Rachmaninoff bought three 'D's, all New York products, for his homes in the United States, but he installed a Hamburg 'D' in his Swiss villa. The difference between the New York and Hamburg Steinway pianos is less noticeable today. Pianist and Steinway Artist Emanuel Ax says that "... the differences have more to do with individual instruments than with where they were made."

Several artists have developed documented association with particular 'D's. Examples would include the following:
Sergei Rachmaninoff recorded all his sessions for Victor in New York on 'D' SN 147,681 and SN 194,597. When Zenph Studios undertook to recreate those recordings through modern computer playback technology, the company chose a 1909 'D', SN 133,291, as the underlying instrument; the restored piano is prominently featured at the company's Internet site.
Vladimir Horowitz favored a 'D' that he called "Beauty." When the instrument became unserviceably worn, he retained piano technician Joseph Pramberger to rebuild it completely.
Glenn Gould maintained a well-known preference for CD (Concert 'D') number 318-C (SN 317,194) that he found, much worn and awaiting shipment back to the factory for decommissioning, in the auditorium of a Toronto department store in early 1960s. He retained technician Verne Edquist to restore and maintain the instrument and had it shipped to any auditorium in which he was to play. The piano sustained a cracked plate during such a shipment in 1971, when Gould had scheduled a recording session with the Cleveland orchestra; for years thereafter, Edquist attempted to repair the damage, and his inability to do so was a source of distress to Gould. The CD 318-C still exists in its damaged state, preserved at Library and Archives Canada in Ottawa, which also houses the Glenn Gould Archive.
To circumvent company policy that would have compelled her to record on a smaller instrument, Olga Samaroff purchased a 'D' on which to make her recordings for Victor late in the acoustic era. Later, finding the size of the instrument to present storage difficulties, she purchased a dwelling in Seal Harbor, Maine, with a studio large enough to house it.

Special editions and price record

Over the years, Steinway has produced a small number of special or limited editions of the D-274. The differences in these pianos can range from ornately carved bodywork to large changes in the colour scheme. Custom-built D-274s have also been made; for example the "fully crystallized" D-274s with over a million individually positioned Swarovski crystals covering each piano.

The White House has a specially designed D-274, which is normally placed in the largest room of the White House, the East Room. The 2002 White House Christmas card features this piano.

The world's most expensive grand piano sold at auction is a specially designed D-274 named Steinway Alma Tadema; it sold for $1.2 million in 1997 at Christie's in London, breaking Steinway's own 1997 price record of $390,000. The D-274 was built in 1883–87 and designed by Sir Lawrence Alma-Tadema. It is displayed at the art museum Clark Art Institute. In 2006, Steinway recreated an exacting replica of this piano.

Recordings 
The D-274 has featured in numerous recordings spanning a wide array of genres and the whole of the history of sound recording. The following list includes some relatively recent examples in a variety of mostly advanced formats, including classical, folk, blues, and new-age albums; one high-end audio test disc; and a celebrated fraud:

Lang Lang – Rachmaninoff: Piano Concerto No. 3 / Scriabin: Etudes. Sergei Rachmaninoff: Piano Concerto No. 3 (Hamburg Steinway D-274; with Saint Petersburg Philharmonic Orchestra, Yuri Temirkanov cond.); Alexander Scriabin: Etudes (New York Steinway D-274). Telarc hybrid SACD 60582.
Piano Duo Trenkner/Speidel – Johann Sebastian Bach (arr. Max Reger): Brandenburg Concerti. (Four-hands arrangements performed on a 1901 Steinway D-274)  MD&G 330 0635–2.
Yoram Ish-Hurwitz – Isaac Albéniz: Iberia. Turtle Records hybrid SACDs TRSA 0029 (books I and II) and TR75530 (books III and IV).
Rachmaninoff Plays Rachmaninoff. RCA Victor 748971 (Recreations by Zenph Studios of performances by Sergei Rachmaninoff drawn from earlier conventional records; the company's Internet site prominently features the instrument used, a 1909 Steinway D-274, no. 133,201, retrofitted with a computerized self-playing mechanism).
Antoine Rebstein – Piano Left Hand Recital. Claves 50-2502 (Compositions for left hand alone by J.S. Bach arr. Johannes Brahms, Camille Saint-Saëns, Dinu Lipatti, Alexander Scriabin, Erwin Schulhoff, and Johann Strauss II arr. Leopold Godowsky, recorded on Steinway D 479 580).
John Gorka – A Gypsy Life (piano performances by Susan Werner). AIX Records Blu-ray Disc 83053 (video and HD Audio).
Marcel Worms – Red White & Blues: 32 New Dutch Blues Pieces (1996-2006) (all tracks feature the Hamburg Steinway D-274), Attacca Records 27103–4.
Gary Girouard – The Naked Piano volumes I-III, Galileo Music Corporation.
Robert Silverman – Johannes Brahms: Intermezzo in E-Flat major, op. 117 no. 1; Mozart: Minuet in G (both on a New York Steinway D-274). Tracks 11 and 12 of Stereophile Test CD 2.
Joyce Hatto – Recordings issued under her name on the Concert Artist Recordings label were said to be recorded on a 1923 Hamburg Steinway D, Serial No 217355, but in fact were unauthorized dubs of recordings by other pianists.

The D-274 has also featured in many television programs, including:
The Super Bowl XLIV on February 7, 2010, was opened with a music video with a performance by Rihanna, Jay-Z, E.S. Posthumus and the Rutgers Symphony Orchestra. The D-274, which is heard and seen especially in the beginning of the music video, was supplied from the Concert & Artist division of Steinway, located at Steinway Hall on Manhattan, New York City.
In the 2009 Nobel Peace Prize Award Ceremony for U.S. President Barack Obama on December 10, 2009, Steinway Artist Lang Lang performed on a D-274 Liebesträume by Franz Liszt.
The inauguration ceremony for US President Barack Obama on January 20, 2009, featured a performance of John Williams's composition Air and Simple Gifts by cellist Yo-Yo Ma, violinist Itzhak Perlman, pianist Gabriela Montero and clarinetist Anthony McGill. Gabriela Montero played on a D-274.
On The Ellen DeGeneres Show on November 17, 2008, seven-year-old child prodigy Emily Bear played on a D-274 her own composition called Once Upon A Wish dedicated for Ellen DeGeneres's and Portia de Rossi's wedding.
In NBC's Today Show on October 18, 2007, Lola Astanova played a D-274.
In a nationally televised commercial aired in Fall 2007, Texas Christian University uses its status as an All-Steinway School to promote itself. The commercial shows a D-274.
In an Emmy nominated television commercial for Mercedes-Benz produced by Gerard De Thame in 2001, a new modern Noah's Ark is shown. This new Noah's Ark has been loaded with two of different sorts of animals, but also with luxury products from the world of today. One of these luxury products is a D-274 filmed from an angle so that the Steinway logo is clearly seen.

Concert grand piano banks 
For the convenience of touring performers and in the belief that every D-274 is somewhat different in character, Steinway maintains a collection of D-274s in "concert grand piano banks" across the world; for instance, the company maintains more than 40 in the basement of Steinway Hall in Manhattan. Such pianos are given "CD" designators, and they receive replacement stencils calculated for greater visibility at a distance. A pianist visiting one of these banks may sample and choose from a range of D-274s, according to taste, for public performance or recording; Steinway prepares and transports the chosen instrument, although the artist bears the cost of these services. As noted above, some artists have developed affinities for particular instruments included in this program; the requirement that instruments so supplied be credited to Steinway led to Olga Samaroff's above-mentioned purchase of a D-274 on which to make records.

Popular accounts of manufacture 
At least three independent accounts have detailed the process by which Steinway manufactures the D-274. In 1982, Michael Lenehan published an article in Atlantic Monthly in which he followed the construction of a D-274, designated as K 2571 during manufacture and later, after its adoption into the piano bank program, as CD-129. A somewhat revised version of the article posted to the Internet includes information updated in 1997. The original article, dating to approximately the time of the company's sale to CBS, described many practices held over from the 19th century, mostly personalized by focusing on individual employees tasked with performing them, but it also touched on what then were prospective changes under consideration to modernize certain aspects of production. The 1997 update continues that approach, updating the various personal stories but also detailing the company's subsequent ownership history and adoption of selected new production methods.

In 2003, The New York Times ran a series of articles, ultimately published in book form, following the construction of a D-274 designated K 0862. In 2007, an independent documentary film entitled Note by Note: The Making of Steinway L1037 followed the construction of a D-274 for more than a year, from the search for wood in Alaska to display of the finished instrument at Manhattan's Steinway Hall. The film received its first theatrical screening at New York's Film Forum in November, 2007 and played to generally favorable notices. Featured are discussions and demonstrations of Steinway instruments generally, and the D-274 in particular, by Steinway family member Henry Z. Steinway and pianists Pierre-Laurent Aimard, Kenny Barron, Bill Charlap, Harry Connick Jr., Hélène Grimaud, Hank Jones, Lang Lang, and Marcus Roberts.

See also
 Shigeru Kawai
 Bösendorfer Imperial

References

Further reading

External links 
Features and specifications of D-274 – Steinway & Sons – European and international headquarters
Features and specifications of D-274 – Steinway & Sons – Americas headquarters
Nine-part series in The New York Times following the production of a D-274
Article in The Atlantic Monthly following the production of a D-274
Photographic poster of D-274

D-274
Piano